Aleksandr Gramovich (born 17 August 1969 in Mazyr, Byelorussian SSR) is a Soviet-born sprint canoer who competed in the early 1990s. He won a bronze medal in the C-2 1000 m event at the 1990 ICF Canoe Sprint World Championships in Poznań.

Gramovich also finished eighth in the C-2 1000 m event at the 1992 Summer Olympics for the Unified Team.

References

Sports-reference.com profile

1969 births
People from Mazyr
Canoeists at the 1992 Summer Olympics
Living people
Olympic canoeists of the Unified Team
Soviet male canoeists
ICF Canoe Sprint World Championships medalists in Canadian
Belarusian male canoeists
Sportspeople from Gomel Region